The De Castro surname is derived from the word Castro the latter of which is a Romance (Italian, Portuguese, Spanish and Galician) word coming from Latin castrum, a fortification. 

The De Castro surname may refer to:

Various members of the de Castro family (Anza Expedition)
Various members of the de Castro family (Sephardi Jewish)